Phil Dowson (born 1 October 1981) is director of rugby at Northampton Saints. He is a former English rugby union player. He played for Worcester Warriors, Northampton Saints and Newcastle Falcons in the Aviva Premiership.

Dowson's position of choice was as a number 8 and he can also operate as a flanker. In 2004 he was a member of Falcons’ Powergen Cup winning side at Twickenham, scoring a try after coming on as a replacement in the final.
Dowson made over 130 appearances for the Falcons and captained the side for two seasons.

Dowson represented the England Sevens team at the 2005 World Cup in Hong Kong. He was then selected for the 2005 Churchill Cup. He was called into the England Saxons side that defeated Ireland A on 1 February 2008.

Dowson represented England Saxons at the 2007 Churchill Cup and 2009 Churchill Cup.

Dowson signed for the Northampton Saints from the Newcastle Falcons in the summer of 2009. In 2012, Dowson gained his first full international cap for England vs Scotland in the Six Nations. A further cap against Italy as well as substitute appearances against France and Ireland.

He was named as England captain for England's next match, although it was a non capped match, against the Barbarians which England went on to win 57–26.

In 2014 Dowson played as a replacement as Northampton beat Saracens to win the Premiership.

He signed for Worcester Warriors having made over 180 appearances for the Saints, in the 2015-16 season in the Aviva Premiership.

On 20 February 2017, Dowson announces his retirement from professional competition at the end of the season, where he will rejoin with his old club Northampton Saints as an assistant coach.

Phil Dowson coached the England XV that faced the Barbarians in June 2019. https://www.theguardian.com/sport/2019/jun/02/england-barbarians-rugby-match-report

Phil Dowson set up a print supply business in 2008. Nth Degree Imaging provides print solutions to the large format and industrial print markets. 
https://ndi.ltd

References

External links
Northampton profile
Newcastle profile
 

1981 births
Living people
England international rugby union players
English rugby union players
Newcastle Falcons players
Northampton Saints players
People educated at Sedbergh School
Rugby union number eights
Rugby union flankers
Rugby union players from Guildford
Worcester Warriors players